Sea Stories was a British television series which aired 1936 to 1937 on the BBC. It was one of the earliest series ever aired on television. It consisted of A.B. Campbell describing the personalities and places he had seen. The programs preceding and following it varied, for example one episode was preceded by Theatre Parade and followed by The World of Women, while another episode was preceded a mix of short variety segments and followed by Sophisticated Cabaret.

None of the episodes still exist, as methods to record live television did not exist until late 1947, and were used very rarely by the BBC until the mid-1950s.

References

External links
Sea Stories on IMDb

1930s British television series
1936 British television series debuts
1937 British television series endings
Lost BBC episodes
BBC Television shows
British live television series
Black-and-white British television shows